The 2017 Sangin airstrike was an American bombing of the Sangin District in the Helmand Province in Afghanistan. The United Nations mission in Afghanistan stated that "initial inquiries suggest that the airstrikes killed at least 18 civilians, nearly all women and children." A spokesman for the Afghan defense ministry, Dawlat Waziri, denied the reports of civilian casualties but witnesses in the area corroborated the UN report that there were no Taliban members in the area and that U.S. troops had visited the neighborhood days before the incident. The governor of the Helmand Province also corroborated that civilians were killed following the province's own independent analysis of the incident. Elders from Sangin put the number of civilian fatalities higher at 22 killed. Brigadier General Charles H. Cleveland, a spokesman for the international coalition, confirmed that the U.S. had conducted approximately 30 airstrikes in Sangin the week prior. The airstrike was also referred to as the Second Sangin airstrike, seeing as the U.S. had previously conducted an airstrike in Sangin in July 2010 that killed numerous civilians.

References 

February 2017 events in Asia
Airstrikes during the War in Afghanistan (2001–2021)
Mass murder in 2017
Massacres committed by the United States
Massacres in Afghanistan
2017 in Afghanistan
2017 airstrikes
Attacks in Afghanistan in 2017